The cinema of Iraq went through a downturn under Saddam Hussein's regime. The development of film and film-going in Iraq reflects the drastic historical shifts that Iraq has experienced in the 20th century. The Iraq War which began in 2003 had an influence on many films being produced.

History

While Iraq's first film projection took place in 1909, cinema was not truly regarded as a cultural activity or pastime until the 1920s. The first cinemas, like the famous al-Zawra cinema on Baghdad's bustling thoroughfare al-Rashid, played mostly American silent films for British citizens.

In the 1940s under the rule of King Faisal II of Iraq, a real Iraqi cinema began. Supported by British and French financiers, movie production companies established themselves in Baghdad. The Baghdad Studio was established in 1948, but soon came apart when tensions between the Arab and Jewish founders flared up. For the most part, the product was purely commercial, fluffy romances with plenty of singing and dancing often set in small villages. The World of Arts (Dunyat Alfann) studio, which was founded by actors, reached for more serious fare. In 1955, they produced Haidar Al-Omar's Fitna wa Hassan, an Iraqi retelling of Romeo and Juliet, that received international attention. But for the most part, the strong-fist rule of the state discouraged any socially relevant films.

In 1959 when King Faisel II's government was overthrown, the Cinema and Theater General organization came into existence with the purpose of promoting the political goals of the new regime both in documentaries and features. Typical were documentaries like the 1969 Al Maghishi Project, which showcased the government's irrigation campaigns and the 1967 A Wedding in Heaven, which celebrates the air force and their weapons system. The 1968 revolution that put the Ba'ath party in power further solidified the government's control of film material, and the state's need to make all films validate its power.

Saddam Hussein's ascension to power in 1979 pushed the Iraqi cinema in a slightly different direction. The drain on national resources from the 1980 Iran–Iraq War brought film production to a near halt. The few films put into production were mainly intent on glorifying a mythic Iraqi history or celebrating Hussein's rule. In 1981, the government commissioned Egyptian filmmaker Salah Abouseif to make Al-Qadisiya, a period epic recounting the triumph of the Arabs over the Persians in 636 AD. Likewise Mohamed Shukri Jameel's melodramatic The Great Question (al-Mas' Ala Al-Kubra) cast British actor Oliver Reed as the vicious Lt-Col Gerard Leachman who is righteously killed in the 1920 Iraqi revolution.

In 1980 Hussein promoted his own mythology with the autobiographical 6-hour epic The Long Days (al-Ayyam al-tawila), the saga of Hussein's participation in the 1958 failed assassination attempt on Prime Minister Abd al-Karim Qasim, and his subsequent heroic escape back to Tikrit. The film was edited and partially directed by Terence Young, the British director who made his name helming the early James Bond films Dr. No and Thunderball (film). Hussein is played by Saddam Kamel, a cousin and son-in-law of Hussein's, who eventually ran afoul of the leader and was murdered in 1996.

After Iraq started attacks against Kuwait, Iraq sanctions made filmmaking an impossibility in the country, although a new generation of filmmakers is coming alive in Baghdad.

Notable Iraqi Actors
Ibraham Alzubaidy, (1978–), starred in the California State University, Northridge screenwriting
Lewis Alsamari, (1976–), starred in the Universal Pictures film United 93
Charlotte Lewis, most notable for her lead female role in The Golden Child alongside Eddie Murphy
Yasmine Hanani, featured in documentary films Voices of Iraq, My Country, My Country and Battle for Haditha (film)
Don Hany, (1975–), (Won Best Actor for Winning the Peace (2005) and known for his role as Theo Rahme in White Collar Blue
Heather Raffo (Iraqi-American born in Michigan), Award-winning playwright/actress most known for her role in 9 Parts of Desire
Shero Rauf
Basam Ridha
Zina Zaflow

Notable Iraqi Film directors

Ibraham Alzubaidy
Abbas Fahdel, director of Dawn of the World
Usama Alshaibi, director of Muhammad and Jane and Nice Bombs
Amer Alwan, known for winning an award for Zaman, The Man From The Reeds
Zana Briski, director of Born into Brothels
Ishtar Yasin Gutierrez
Anisa Mehdi, Emmy Award-winning film director, journalist and director of Inside Mecca
Najeen
Shero Rauf
Maysoon Pachachi, director of Return to the Land of Wonders
Rashed Radwan
Saad Salman, film director known for his documentary Baghdad On/Off
Baz Shamoun, film director and maker of short documentary Where is Iraq?
Oday Rasheed, director and writer, Underexposure and Qarantina
Mohamed Al-Daradji, director of Ahlaam and Son of Babylon
Mohanad Hayal, director of Haifa Street
Ali Raheem, director of Balanja

Films

Films shot in Iraq
The Exorcist (1973) - Hatra was used as the setting for the opening scene.
Back to Babylon (film) (2002) - A documentary film shot in Babylon, Hilla, Baghdad and Hīt
ZAMAN,the man who lives in the reeds|ZAMAN, The Man Who Lives in the Reeds (2003) - A feature film by Amer Alwan
The War Tapes (2003)
About Baghdad (2003) - A documentary film shot in Baghdad.
Underexposure (2005) - A docufiction, the first feature film after the American occupation began in 2003
We Iraqis (2004) - A documentary film shot in Baghdad, Hilla and Hīt
Ahlaam (2004) - A feature film by Mohamed Al Daradji.
Voices of Iraq (2004)
Gunner Palace (2005)
Valley of the Wolves Iraq (2006) - The movie is set in northern Iraq during the Occupation of Iraq.
Nice Bombs (2006) a documentary by Usama Alshaibi was shot in Baghdad in early 2004.
Iraq in Fragments (2006) - Documentary film on the Iraq War.
I Want to Live (2015) - Documentary film on Refugees of the Syrian civil war.
My Country, My Country (2006)
Searching for Hassan (2007) Mosul - A documentary film by Edouard Beau
Life In Darkness (2018)

See also

 Cinema of the world
 Television in Iraq

Further reading
Guardian article on history of Iraqi cinema http://film.guardian.co.uk/print/0,,4558601-103550,00.html

External links
 Iraq has started to reopen cinemas.